Bayview is an unincorporated community in South Harbor Township, Mille Lacs County, Minnesota, United States.  The community is located along State Highway 27 (MN 27) at 92nd Avenue near Onamia and Isle.

References

Unincorporated communities in Mille Lacs County, Minnesota
Unincorporated communities in Minnesota